The M2 Hills Motorway is a  tollway in Sydney, New South Wales that is part of the Sydney Orbital Network and the National Highway west of Pennant Hills Road. Owned by toll road operator Transurban, it forms majority of Sydney's M2 route, with the Lane Cove Tunnel constituting the rest of the M2 route. 

The M2 cycleway is located on the breakdown lanes of the M2 Hills Motorway.

Route
The M2 Hills Motorway connects directly with the Lane Cove Tunnel at the Lane Cove River in North Ryde and heads north-west through Macquarie Park to Epping, then West through Beecroft, Carlingford then through Baulkham Hills and Winston Hills onto the Westlink M7 motorway at Seven Hills. The motorway runs underneath the suburb of North Epping via  twin tunnels known as the Epping/Norfolk tunnels.

Connection to NorthConnex
The NorthConnex opened on 31 October 2020 and includes motorway-to-motorway ramps to and from the portion of the M2 west of Pennant Hills Road/Cumberland Highway. Connection between NorthConnex and the eastern portion of the M2 is via Pennant Hills Road and ramps on Pennant Hills Road.

Tolls
The M2 uses a cashless tolling system, where tolls are charged on the basis of vehicles being either Class A (which includes most private vehicles) or Class B (vehicles with two axles and are over 2.8 metres high, or vehicles with three axles which are over 2 metres high, or vehicles with more than three axles). Toll prices are updated four times a year.

Ownership
At opening, the motorway was owned by the Hills Motorway Group, which was owned by Colonial First State (26.7%), Abigroup (8.1%), Obayashi Corporation (8.1%), Mercantile Mutual, Portfolio Partners and AMP Limited. Macquarie Infrastructure Group (MIG) later purchased Obayshi's 8.1% share. In 2000, MIG planned to take over Hills Motorway Group but this did not eventuate. In April 2004, Transurban acquired Abigroup's 8.1% stake of the motorway. In February 2005, Transurban mounted a takeover bid of Hills Motorway for $1.8 billion. The takeover bid was successful and finalised in May 2005.

Separate to ownership, in January 2006, Transurban acquired Tollaust, which managed the tolls and operated and maintained the motorway. Tollaust was also owned by Abigroup. The acquisition was completed in February 2006.

The concessional tolling period ends in June 2048. It was originally planned to end in 2042, before it was extended to May 2046.

Interchanges

History

Castlereagh Freeway
Road approaches from Sydney's western suburbs were originally slow and traffic passed through Parramatta and to the city centre via Victoria Road and Western Freeway. Parramatta was bypassed in 1986, however peak hour traffic still clogged up Victoria Road and all western approaches to Sydney.

Proposals for an F2 Castlereagh Freeway were released in 1968. The freeway would branch from the Lane Cove Valley Expressway (F3) near Herring Road at North Ryde (now Macquarie Park), and head west towards the western suburbs as far as Londonderry at the foot of the Blue Mountains.

Protests in 1974 led to suspension of works and cancellation of Lane Cove Valley Expressway in 1977. The Castlereagh Freeway proposal was thus extended eastwards over the Lane Cove Valley Expressway corridor to the junction of Epping Road and Pittwater Road near the Channel 10 North Ryde site. A possible connection to Fig Tree Bridge was also considered.

1989 Proposal
Land for the F2 freeway was purchased by NSW Government in 1988 and the road from Gladesville Bridge to Hunters Hill (Fig Tree Bridge) was built to freeway-style standards. Between June and July 1989, the newly formed Roads & Traffic Authority (RTA) exhibited the Environmental Impact Statement (EIS) that proposed a 11.5 km four-lane Castlereagh Freeway between Pennant Hills Road and Lane Cove River at North Ryde, known as F2 Stage 1. In the proposal, the link to Epping Road at Marsfield, and the link to Fig Tree Bridge at Hunters Hill were abandoned.

Subsequently, a Commission of Inquiry on the 1989 proposal was set up and chaired by the commissioner John Woodward. In July 1990, the commissioner released a report recommending that the freeway should not be built, but instead upgrade the east–west road system between Pennant Hills Road and Epping Road at North Ryde. The report stressed that the findings only applied to the 1989 proposal (i.e. east of Pennant Hills Road) and "should not be taken in any way to be a judgment on the construction of the roadway west of Pennant Hills Road".

The commission also mentioned that if an expressway were to be built, North Epping residents had indicated that they would prefer a tunnel under the locality instead of a cut and fill which they deemed excessive. The commission was also in support of a tunnel if the expressway was to be built. The tunnel was incorporated in later design proposals and was eventually built as the Epping/Norfolk Tunnel.

1992 Proposal
In September 1990, the Minister of Roads Wal Murray announced a preparation of a new EIS for a transport link for Sydney's North West region, later known as the North West Transport Link. The transport link was proposed to connect Old Windsor Road, Seven Hills to Epping Road, North Ryde, bypassing the Carlingford Road and Epping Road. The proposed link would continue eastwards onto Epping Road, then would connect with the Gore Hill Freeway at Artarmon, which led to the Warringah Freeway at North Sydney, then onto the Bradfield Highway, the Sydney Harbour Bridge and the Sydney central business district.

Environmental impact assessments were done separately for the section between Old Windsor Road and Pennant Hills Road (western section) and the section between Pennant Hills Road and Epping Road (eastern section), by SMEC and Maunsell respectively. However, the two assessments were to be done in cooperation to ensure integration of the proposal.

Western Section
There were three shortlisted options for utilising the Castlereagh Freeway reserve between Old Windsor Road and Pennant Hills Road in the western section:
Alternative 1: Four-lane expressway via the reserve with a busway in the median, continuing to a proposed expressway east of Pennant Hills Road (i.e. eastern section). No toll and two toll options were considered for this alternative.
Alternative 2: Four-lane expressway via the reserve, terminating at Pennant Hills Road. Pennant Hills Road, Carlingford Road and Epping Road would be upgraded and continue as the arterial route east of the expressway. The busway would be in the median between Old Windsor Road and Barclays Road, before continuing along Barclays, North Rocks, Pennant Hills, and Carlingford Roads. This alternative would not be tolled.
Alternative 3: Arterial road via the reserve between Old Windsor Road and Barclays Road, before continuing along Barclays, North Rocks, Pennant Hills, and Carlingford Roads. Exclusive bus lanes would be provided on the kerb lanes of the new road.

Alternative 3 was evaluated to have the least environmental impact but have the worst transport efficiency and safety out of the three alternatives. It also received little support from the community. As such, Alternative 3 was eliminated from further evaluation and detailed assessment, leaving only Alternatives 1 and 2. Alternative 1 was chosen as the design of the expressway.

Eastern Section

During the assessment, the 1989 proposal was not considered.

One busway lane in each direction would be in the centre of the expressway between Pennant Hills Road and Beecroft Road, continuing from the proposed busway in the western section. The busway would leave the expressway and would lead via Beecroft Road to a bus interchange at Epping Station. It would be constructed to allow for a future conversion to light rail.

Grade-separated interchanges would be built at Delhi Road, Lane Cove Road, Balaclava Road (now Christie Road) and Beecroft Road. The eastern section will connect to the western section at the grade-separated Pennant Hills Road interchange.

Construction
In May 1993, the government announced that the road would be constructed with private funds using a Build Own Operate Transfer. The Government then entered into an agreement with Hills Motorway Limited to build and operate the M2 for 45 years, before ownership will revert to the government. The motorway pioneered the use of electronic tolling in Australia.

A two-lane busway was built in the median between Windsor Road to Beecroft Road with a connection to Epping Train Station. There were dedicated access ramps for buses, which were removed in 2012 during road works to widen the motorway.

Mahers Road in Carlingford, running east–west along the southern boundary of Pennant Hills Golf Course, was completely removed, and replaced by the new expressway. Pennant Hills Road was also realigned near Mahers Road, with the old section of the road now known as Mahers Close.

Protests
There was strong community opposition to the construction of the motorway by local residents and environment groups including the Nature Conservation Council, as the route would destroy a vast area of valuable urban bushland, the money would be better spent on public transport infrastructure and the air pollution from private motor vehicles would contribute to global warming. There were also fears the bus lanes might be removed in the future to provide additional capacity for private vehicles. "Freeway Busters" was one of the groups that organised protests, including two "Cyclestormings" of the construction site by hundreds of cyclists. The opening ceremony of the tollway in 1997, a champagne breakfast for conservative dignitaries including Alan Jones and a "celebrity drive-through" featuring swimmer Susie Maroney, was disrupted by sound systems mounted high in gum trees, playing the sound of car crashes, ambulance sirens and jack-hammers. After the motorway opened, cyclists also protested the toll which the operators charged cyclists by occupying the toll plaza. This protest was successful, and the toll was subsequently dropped.

Operation
The motorway was opened on 26 May 1997. After opening, the road's usage had been nearly 30% below forecasts in a 1994 prospectus, however, morning peak traffic had sometimes exceeded those same forecasts for short bursts.

The Westlink M7, opened on 16 December 2005, continues along the original Castlereagh Freeway alignment from Seven Hills to Dean Park, where the M7 turns south away from the Castlereagh Freeway corridor towards the M5 South-West Motorway and Hume Motorway at Prestons. The unused but still reserved corridor continues west and passes north of suburbs including Shalvey and Willmot, continuing west past Llandilo to stop abruptly near Londonderry at the foot of the Blue Mountains.

The Lane Cove Tunnel, which linked the M2 at Lane Cove, opened on 25 March 2007.

A third traffic lane westbound between the Lane Cove Road and Beecroft Road interchanges which utilises a former cycling/breakdown lane opened in April 2007. This change was criticised by cyclists, who were required to use an alternative route as a result, and by some motorists who have said that the addition of a third lane will induce more traffic and would only shift the bottleneck further down the motorway as a result of assisting and maintaining free-flowing traffic from the Lane Cove Tunnel. A speed camera to enforce the 70 km/h limit was introduced on the westbound carriageway just before the Epping/Norfolk Road tunnel.

Tolling became fully cashless with no toll booths 30 January 2012. Transurban had originally proposed that it would become cashless from December 2007.

A major upgrade started in January 2011, with more on-and off-ramps being built, including off-ramps onto Windsor Road eastbound, which was completed in July 2012, and a westbound off-ramp and eastbound on-ramp at Macquarie Park, which were completed in January 2013. During the upgrade, the fixed speed camera installed before the Epping/Norfolk Road tunnel was removed in mid 2013, and by November 2014 the speed limit was lifted to 100 km/h limit along the length of the M2.

After initially refusing to include construction of east-facing ramps to Lane Cove Road as a part of the M2 Upgrade Project, Transurban and the NSW Government reached agreement to construct a new on-ramp in February 2013. The tolled ramp, which allows southbound traffic from Lane Cove Road to enter the M2 motorway towards Sydney, eliminating the need to travel through the busy Macquarie Park area to enter the motorway through the Epping Road or Macquarie Park on-ramps, opened in July 2014. There was no provision for northbound traffic from Lane Cove Road to enter the motorway eastbound, nor for westbound motorway traffic to exit at Lane Cove Road.

On 20 March 2018, the Government of New South Wales and Transurban started testing driverless cars on the M2 Hills Motorway. The launch coincided with the death of a pedestrian struck by a similarly human-supervised autonomous vehicle in Arizona.

See also

 Freeways in Australia

References

External links
 Hills M2 Motorway
 Hills M2 - Roam Express
 Web Cam (M2-Ryde)
 F3 to Sydney Orbital route study
 RTA Hills M2 Motorway

Highways in Sydney
Toll roads in Australia
The Hills Shire